Sons of the Neon Night is an unreleased Hong Kong crime thriller film written, produced and directed by Juno Mak and starring an ensemble cast led by Takeshi Kaneshiro, Sean Lau, Louis Koo,  Tony Leung Ka-fai and Gao Yuanyuan. Production for the film began in June 2017 and wrapped up in March 2018. It was set for release in 2019.

Plot
A sudden explosion which killed a wealthy Hong Kong businessmen has drawn the wrestle between drug traffickers and those against drugs. The heir of the drug trafficking syndicate does not hesitate to create social chaos, with his sole reason for believing "a world without drugs", which is actually more terrible and more chaotic than imagined.

Director Juno Mak had mentioned that, "A land free of drugs depicts utopia, or so they say - Yet only those who have been there would know the eternal flames that burn in that place called Hell. It was with his creation of medicine that men began deluding himself about the illusive power to ordain life and death. Be it naivety or arrogance, we glory in awe, eyes closed; deaf to the quiet humming of destruction that lingers on the edge of desire. As it goes, blood weeps more eagerly than tears in a merciless world."

Cast
Takeshi Kaneshiro as an heir to a major financial company hoping to wipe out the dark history of his family
Sean Lau as a double-faced police officer
Louis Koo as Ching Man-sing, a killer with a complicated past
Tony Leung Ka-fai as a psychologist serving for the police force
Gao Yuanyuan as a retired therapist
Michelle Wai
Wyman Wong
Jiang Peiyao as Little Yip, a killer  
Rose Maria Velasco
Carl Ng
Wilson Lam
Ching Tung
Tony Liu
Clement Fung
Lo Hoi-pang
Jerald Chan
Lowell Lo
Kam Kwok-leung
Paw Hee-ching
Jason Choi
Conan Lee
Wang Shunde
Philippe Joly as Enzo

Production
The project was first announced on 25 March at the 2015 Hong Kong Filmart as Juno Mak's second directorial feature after the 2013 film, Rigor Mortis. According to Mak, the film's script took over five years to develop.

In June 2017, it was reported that the film has begun production with a budget of HK$150 million and confirmed cast members of  Takeshi Kaneshiro, Sean Lau, Louis Koo and  Tony Leung Ka-fai

On 25 September 2017, filming of a snowing scene took place outside Windsor House, despite being 30 °C, in which Lau took part in.

On 28 September 2017, the film held its first press conference, where director Mak and cast members Sean Lau, Tony Leung Ka-fai, Gao Yuanyuan and Michelle Wai attended. A two-minute behind-the-scene featurette, the teaser film poster and various character photostills were released. It was also revealed the film crew constructed a 1:1 replica of Causeway Bay in Huizhou for the shooting of the film's large scale opening.

On 27 March 2018, it was reported that production for the film has officially wrapped up after eight months of filming, with another two minute behind-the-scene featurette being released.

Release
On 21 March 2018, Juno Mak promoted the film at the 2018 Hong Kong Filmart, where he revealed the film is planned for release in 2019. In 2020, it was reported that the movie  is expected to be released in 2021. As of June 2022, the film was not released yet.

References

External links

Cantonese-language films
Films about drugs
Films set in Hong Kong
Films shot in Guangdong
Films shot in Hong Kong
Hong Kong crime thriller films
Police detective films
Shaw Brothers Studio films
Unreleased films